The 2002 World Rally Championship was the 30th season of the FIA World Rally Championship. The season consisted of 14 rallies. Marcus Grönholm won his second drivers' world championship in a Peugeot 206 WRC, ahead of Petter Solberg and Carlos Sainz. The manufacturers' title was won by Peugeot, ahead of Ford and Subaru.

Calendar

The 2002 championship was contested over fourteen rounds in Europe, Africa, South America and Oceania.

Teams and drivers

JWRC entries

PWRC entries

Results and standings

Drivers' championship

Manufacturers' championship

JWRC Drivers' championship

Events

External links

 FIA World Rally Championship 2002 at ewrc-results.com

World Rally Championship
World Rally Championship seasons